Spoken Greatest Hits is a compilation album from the Christian rock band Spoken. It contains songs from their first three albums under the Metro 1 Music label before the band signed with Tooth & Nail Records.

Track listing
 "A Question Alone" - 4:41 	
 "People Get Ready... Jesus Is Comin'"	 - 4:08
 "Fly With Me" - 3:42
 "I Won't Lie Down" (Face to Face Cover) - 3:12
 "On Your Feet" - 2:52
 "Silent Voice" - 2:55
 "Runaway" - 5:13
 "Forevermore" - 4:35
 "Stupid People" - 2:01
 "Prepare to Meet Thy God" - 3:19
 "The Way You Want Me to Be" - 7:05
 "This Path" - 3:29
 "David" - 4:55
 "In the Silence" - 5:17

Spoken (band) albums
2001 greatest hits albums